The 2016 AFC Cup group stage was played from 23 February to 11 May 2016. A total of 32 teams competed in the group stage to decide the 16 places in the knockout stage of the 2016 AFC Cup.

Draw

The seeding of each team in the draw was determined by their association and their qualifying position within their association. The mechanism of the draw was as follows:
For the West Zone, a draw was held for the three associations with two direct entrants (Iraq, Jordan, Oman) to determine the seeds 1 placed in order for Groups A, B and C. The remaining teams were then allocated to the groups according to the rules set by AFC.
For the East Zone, a draw was held for the seven associations with two direct entrants (Hong Kong, Myanmar, Malaysia, India, Singapore, Maldives, Philippines) to determine the four associations occupying seeds 1 and 2, with seeds 1 placed in order for Groups E, F, G and H, and the three associations occupying seeds 3 and 4, with seeds 3 placed in order for Groups E, F and G. The remaining teams were then allocated to the groups according to the rules set by AFC.

The following 32 teams (16 from West Zone, 16 from East Zone) entered into the group-stage draw, which included the 28 direct entrants and the four winners of the qualifying play-off, whose identity were not known at the time of the draw.

Notes

Format

Tiebreakers

Schedule
The schedule of each matchday was as follows.

Groups

Group A

Group B

Group C

Group D

Group E

Group F

Group G

Group H

Notes

References

External links
AFC Cup, the-AFC.com

2